American rock band Wheatus has released five studio albums, two EPs and eight singles.

Albums

Studio albums

Live albums

Extended plays

Singles

Music videos

References
Footnotes

Citations

Discographies of American artists